Major-General Lord Robert William Manners, CB (14 December 1781 – 15 November 1835) was a British soldier and nobleman.

Life
He was the third son of Charles Manners, 4th Duke of Rutland and Lady Mary Somerset, daughter of Charles Somerset, 4th Duke of Beaufort.  They were members of the Prince of Wales' set. 
He and his brother Charles Manners were among the financial supporters of their friend George Bryan Brummell,  aka "Beau" Brummell, during his long exile in Calais and Caen.  Lord Robert commanded the 10th (Prince of Wales's Own) Regiment of (Light) Dragoons (Hussars) during the Waterloo Campaign.

With a break of one year between 1831 and 1832, he represented various constituencies of the family interest in Parliament from 1802 until his death.

He died suddenly in the afternoon of 15November 1835 at Belvoir Castle, Leicestershire, and was interred in the estate's mausoleum.

References

Bibliography

External links 
 

1781 births
1835 deaths
British Army generals
Companions of the Order of the Bath
Members of the Parliament of the United Kingdom for Leicestershire
Younger sons of dukes
UK MPs 1802–1806
UK MPs 1806–1807
UK MPs 1807–1812
UK MPs 1812–1818
UK MPs 1818–1820
UK MPs 1820–1826
UK MPs 1826–1830
UK MPs 1830–1831
UK MPs 1831–1832
UK MPs 1832–1835
R